In the Colognian dialects, pronouns come in several variations.
There are demonstrative pronouns, relative pronouns stressed and unstressed definite personal pronouns, indefinite personal pronouns, generalizing personal pronouns, impersonal pronouns, interrogative pronouns, possessive pronouns, …

Pronoun use and semantics 
Colognian demonstrative pronouns are used in sentences in positions where a noun phrase led by stressed or demonstrative article could be used as well. The pronoun 'replaces' it for brevity. In fact, a demonstrative pronoun can formally be seen as a noun phrase with the article retained and anything else spared, because grammar forms of demonstrative pronouns and those of demonstrative articles exhibit no differences. Demonstrative pronouns are either strict anaphora, or can be cataphora being resolved within the same or next sentence or subsentence. The use as exophora is possible and reduces the choice of intonation and stress patterns to exactly one, most commonly supported by appropriate gestures.
 Example of cataphoric use: 
 Example of anaphoric use: 

There are personal pronouns for a variety of uses in Colognian. They all have in common that they link declension with an aspect of conjugation with their forms. Colognian declension follows a case, gender, number scheme, whereas declension among others has a person and number scheme with three grammatical persons: the 1st person referring to the speaker or speakers as agents or patients of a sentence, the 2nd person addresses the listener or listeners of the speaker or speakers as agents or patients of a sentence, while the 3rd person refers to something or someone else but the speaker(s) or the listener(s) as the agents or patients of a sentence, and two grammatical numbers, singular and plural. Declensed forms of personal pronouns combine these schemes.

Most possessive pronouns have two distinct uses, some have three or four.
 A possessive pronoun can replace an article, that is why Colognian possessive pronouns can also de called possessive articles. 
 Example: 
 Like a demonstrative pronoun, a possessive pronoun can stand alone representing an entire noun phrase. It can be used exophoric or strict anaphoric, a cataphoric use must be resolved within the same or next sentence or sub-sentence.
 Example: 
 One of the Cologinan genitives, namely the form having to precede its referent, can also be described as a possessive expression having the form: article-dative + noun-dative + possessive-pronoun-3rd person-nominative
 Example: 
 
…

Pronoun declensions

References

Bibliography 
 Ferdinand Münch: Grammatik der ripuarisch-fränkischen Mundart. Cohen, Bonn 1904. (online)Reprinted with permission: Saendig Reprint Verlag, Wiesbaden 1970, under a license by Verlag Bouvier, Bonn.
 Fritz Hoenig: Wörterbuch der Kölner Mundart. second, extended edition, Cologne 1905.
 Alice Tiling-Herrwegen: De kölsche Sproch, Kurzgrammatik Kölsch-Deutsch. Bachem-Verlag Köln. 1st edition, 2002. 
 Christa Bhatt, Alice Herrwegen: Das Kölsche Wörterbuch. Bachem-Verlag Köln. 2nd edition, 2005. 

Pronouns
Colognian